The Al Rahman Islamic Center is a mosque in Mississauga, Ontario, Canada, a city of 734,000 west of Toronto, Ontario, Canada.

References

External links
Al Rahman Islamic Centre

Mosques in Ontario
Buildings and structures in Mississauga